Hollesley Bay is a bay on the coast of Suffolk, England, near the village of Hollesley. Nelson brought his fleet here in 1801.

See also
 Hollesley Bay (HM Prison)

References

Landforms of Suffolk
Bays of England